Armenian National Agrarian University (ANAU), is a state university and higher educational institution based in Yerevan, the capital of Armenia.The university trains and prepares specialists for the agricultural sphere.

Overview
On May 6, 1930, the Agricultural Institute of the Armenian Soviet Socialist Republic was formed on the basis of the Faculty of Agriculture of the Yerevan State University.

In 1994, the Institute was restructured to form the Armenian National Agrarian University as a result of the merger with the Yerevan Zoo-technical Veterinary Institute and the Armenian Agricultural Academy.

Departments
Currently, the university has 5 departments:
Department of Agronomy
Department of Food Technologies
Department of Agrarian Engineering
Department of Veterinary Medicine and Animal Husbandry
Department of Agribusiness and Economics

Branches
As of 2017, the university has the following branches outside the capital Yerevan:
Vanadzor branch.
Sisian branch.
Shirak branch.
Shushi branch (Artsakh Republic).

See also
 List of modern universities in Europe (1801–1945)

References

External links

 

Universities in Armenia
Educational institutions established in 1930
1930 establishments in Armenia